Below is a list of the 26 members of the European Parliament for the Netherlands in the 2019 to 2024 session.

Party representation

Mutations

2019
 23 May: election for the European Parliament in the Netherlands.
 6 June: Forum for Democracy joins the European Conservatives and Reformists.
 11 June: the election committee elects Rob Rooken for the empty seat of Thierry Baudet in the European Parliament, because Baudet did not accept the seat. He has 28 days to accept or reject.
 12 June: Alliance of Liberals and Democrats for Europe group (ALDE group) becomes Renew Europe.
 12 June: Europe of Nations and Freedom becomes Identity and Democracy.
 19 June: the Christian Union leaves the European Conservatives and Reformists and asks to join the European People's Party group.
 19 June: 50PLUS joins the European People's Party group.
 2 July: Beginning of the 9th European Parliament session (2019–2024).
 2 July: Frans Timmermans from the Labour Party did not accept his seat.
 8 July: the election committee elects Lara Wolters for the empty seat of Frans Timmermans in the European Parliament, because Timmermans did not accept the seat. She has 28 days to accept or reject.
 9 July: Lara Wolters is installed in the European Parliament as a replacement for Frans Timmermans of the Labour Party.

List

By name

| style="text-align:left;" colspan="11" | 
|-
! Name
! Sex
! National party
! Group
! Period
! Preference vote
|-
| style="text-align:left;" | Malik Azmani
| style="text-align:left;" | Male
| style="text-align:left;" |  People's Party for Freedom and Democracy
| style="text-align:left;" |  RE
| style="text-align:left;" | 2 July 2019 – Present
| style="text-align:left;" | 365,155
|-
| style="text-align:left;" | Tom Berendsen
| style="text-align:left;" | Male
| style="text-align:left;" |  Christian Democratic Appeal
| style="text-align:left;" |  EPP
| style="text-align:left;" | 2 July 2019 – Present
| style="text-align:left;" | 28,579
|-
| style="text-align:left;" | Mohammed Chahim
| style="text-align:left;" | Male
| style="text-align:left;" |  Labour Party
| style="text-align:left;" |  S&D
| style="text-align:left;" | 2 July 2019 – Present
| style="text-align:left;" | 2,825
|-
| style="text-align:left;" | Peter van Dalen
| style="text-align:left;" | Male
| style="text-align:left;" |  Christian Union
| style="text-align:left;" |  EPP
| style="text-align:left;" | 14 July 2009 – Present
| style="text-align:left;" | 240,459
|-
| style="text-align:left;" | Bas Eickhout
| style="text-align:left;" | Male
| style="text-align:left;" |  GroenLinks
| style="text-align:left;" |  G–EFA
| style="text-align:left;" | 14 July 2009 – Present
| style="text-align:left;" | 263,034
|-
| style="text-align:left;" | Derk Jan Eppink
| style="text-align:left;" | Male
| style="text-align:left;" |  Forum for Democracy
| style="text-align:left;" |  ECR
| style="text-align:left;" | 14 July 2009 – 1 July 20142 July 2019 – Present
| style="text-align:left;" | 339,988
|-
| style="text-align:left;" | Anja Hazekamp
| style="text-align:left;" | Female
| style="text-align:left;" |  Party for the Animals
| style="text-align:left;" |  EUL–NGL
| style="text-align:left;" | 1 July 2014 – Present
| style="text-align:left;" | 136,224
|-
| style="text-align:left;" | Jan Huitema
| style="text-align:left;" | Male
| style="text-align:left;" |  People's Party for Freedom and Democracy
| style="text-align:left;" |  RE
| style="text-align:left;" | 1 July 2014 – Present
| style="text-align:left;" | 115,738
|-
| style="text-align:left;" | Agnes Jongerius
| style="text-align:left;" | Female
| style="text-align:left;" |  Labour Party
| style="text-align:left;" |  S&D
| style="text-align:left;" | 1 July 2014 – Present
| style="text-align:left;" | 109,987
|-
| style="text-align:left;" | Esther de Lange
| style="text-align:left;" | Female
| style="text-align:left;" |  Christian Democratic Appeal
| style="text-align:left;" |  EPP
| style="text-align:left;" | 1 April 2007 – Present
| style="text-align:left;" | 402,975
|-
| style="text-align:left;" | Jeroen Lenaers
| style="text-align:left;" | Male
| style="text-align:left;" |  Christian Democratic Appeal
| style="text-align:left;" |  EPP
| style="text-align:left;" | 1 July 2014 – Present
| style="text-align:left;" | 50,121
|-
| style="text-align:left;" | Toine Manders
| style="text-align:left;" | Male
| style="text-align:left;" |  50PLUS
| style="text-align:left;" |  EPP
| style="text-align:left;" | 20 July 1999 – 1 July 20142 July 2019 – Present
| style="text-align:left;" | 127,228
|-
| style="text-align:left;" | Caroline Nagtegaal-van Doorn
| style="text-align:left;" | Female
| style="text-align:left;" |  People's Party for Freedom and Democracy
| style="text-align:left;" |  RE
| style="text-align:left;" | 14 November 2017 – Present
| style="text-align:left;" | 163,279
|-
| style="text-align:left;" | Kati Piri
| style="text-align:left;" | Female
| style="text-align:left;" |  Labour Party
| style="text-align:left;" |  S&D
| style="text-align:left;" | 1 July 2014 – Present
| style="text-align:left;" | 29,475
|-
| style="text-align:left;" | Samira Rafaela
| style="text-align:left;" | Female
| style="text-align:left;" |  Democrats 66
| style="text-align:left;" |  RE
| style="text-align:left;" | 2 July 2019 – Present
| style="text-align:left;" | 32,510
|-
| style="text-align:left;" | Rob Roos
| style="text-align:left;" | Male
| style="text-align:left;" |  Forum for Democracy
| style="text-align:left;" |  ECR
| style="text-align:left;" | 2 July 2019 – Present
| style="text-align:left;" | 41,323
|-
| style="text-align:left;" | Rob Rooken
| style="text-align:left;" | Male
| style="text-align:left;" |  Forum for Democracy
| style="text-align:left;" |  ECR
| style="text-align:left;" | 2 July 2019 – Present
| style="text-align:left;" | 10,143
|-
| style="text-align:left;" | Bert-Jan Ruissen
| style="text-align:left;" | Male
| style="text-align:left;" |  Reformed Political Party
| style="text-align:left;" |  ECR
| style="text-align:left;" | 2 July 2019 – Present
| style="text-align:left;" | 44,416
|-
| style="text-align:left;" | Annie Schreijer-Pierik
| style="text-align:left;" | Female
| style="text-align:left;" |  Christian Democratic Appeal
| style="text-align:left;" |  EPP
| style="text-align:left;" | 1 July 2014 – Present
| style="text-align:left;" | 113,914
|-
| style="text-align:left;" | Liesje Schreinemacher
| style="text-align:left;" | Female
| style="text-align:left;" |  People's Party for Freedom and Democracy
| style="text-align:left;" |  RE
| style="text-align:left;" | 2 July 2019 – Present
| style="text-align:left;" | 37,519
|-
| style="text-align:left;" | Kim van Sparrentak
| style="text-align:left;" | Female
| style="text-align:left;" |  GroenLinks
| style="text-align:left;" |  G–EFA
| style="text-align:left;" | 2 July 2019 – Present
| style="text-align:left;" | 32,505
|-
| style="text-align:left;" | Tineke Strik
| style="text-align:left;" | Female
| style="text-align:left;" |  GroenLinks
| style="text-align:left;" |  G–EFA
| style="text-align:left;" | 2 July 2019 – Present
| style="text-align:left;" | 149,628
|-
| style="text-align:left;" | Paul Tang
| style="text-align:left;" | Male
| style="text-align:left;" |  Labour Party
| style="text-align:left;" |  S&D
| style="text-align:left;" | 1 July 2014 – Present
| style="text-align:left;" | 8,497
|-
| style="text-align:left;" | Vera Tax
| style="text-align:left;" | Female
| style="text-align:left;" |  Labour Party
| style="text-align:left;" |  S&D
| style="text-align:left;" | 2 July 2019 – Present
| style="text-align:left;" | 12,760
|-
| style="text-align:left;" | Sophie in 't Veld
| style="text-align:left;" | Female
| style="text-align:left;" |  Democrats 66
| style="text-align:left;" |  RE
| style="text-align:left;" | 20 July 2004 – Present
| style="text-align:left;" | 248,383
|-
| style="text-align:left;" | Lara Wolters
| style="text-align:left;" | Female
| style="text-align:left;" |  Labour Party
| style="text-align:left;" |  S&D
| style="text-align:left;" | 9 July 2019 – Present
| style="text-align:left;" | 4,888
|-
|-style="background-color:#dcdcdc"
| style="text-align:left;" colspan="6" |
|-
|}

By party

On the Labour Party list: (S&D)

 Agnes Jongerius
 Kati Piri
 Paul Tang
 Vera Tax
 Mohammed Chahim
 Lara Wolters

On the People's Party for Freedom and Democracy list: (Renew Europe)

 Malik Azmani (top candidate)
 Caroline Nagtegaal-van Doorn
 Jan Huitema
 Liesje Schreinemacher

On the Christian Democratic Appeal list: (EPP Group)

 Esther de Lange (top candidate)
 Annie Schreijer-Pierik
 Jeroen Lenaers
 Tom Berendsen

On the Forum for Democracy list: (ECR Group)

 Derk Jan Eppink (top candidate)
 Rob Roos
 Rob Rooken

On the GroenLinks list: (Greens-EFA)

 Bas Eickhout (top candidate)
 Tineke Strik
 Kim van Sparrentak

On the Democrats 66 list: (Renew Europe)

 Sophie in 't Veld (top candidate)
 Samira Rafaela

On the Christian Union – Reformed Political Party list: (EPP Group / ECR Group)

 Peter van Dalen (Christian Union, EPP Group) (top candidate)
 Bert-Jan Ruissen (SGP, ECR Group)

On the Party for the Animals list: (GUE/NGL Group)

 Anja Hazekamp (top candidate)

On the 50PLUS list: (EPP Group)

 Toine Manders (top candidate)

References 

2019
Netherlands
List